Gikiewicz is a Polish surname. Notable people with the surname include:
Łukasz Gikiewicz (born 1987), Polish footballer
Rafał Gikiewicz (born 1987), Polish footballer

Polish-language surnames